The Chronica Adefonsi Imperatoris, meaning "Chronicle of Alfonso the Emperor", is a chronicle of the reign of Alfonso VII of León, Emperor of Spain, lasting from 1126 to 1157. The author is anonymous, but he covers far more than just the imperial court. 

The Chronica is not hagiographical of the emperor, but is supportive of his imperial policies and takes the concept of an imperium Hispaniae most seriously. The interrelations of the various peninsular kingdoms are laboured extensively, as are Alfonso's pretensions. The Chronica provides the best source of information on twelfth-century Castile-León.

References
Simon Barton and Richard Fletcher, The World of El Cid: Chronicles of the Spanish Reconquest, 2000, ; "Introduction to the Chronica Adefonsi Imperatoris", pp. 148-161.

Editions
Simon Barton and Richard Fletcher, The World of El Cid: Chronicles of the Spanish Reconquest, 2000, ; pp. 162-263.
Glenn Edward Lipskey, ed. and trans. The Chronicle of Alfonso the Emperor: A Translation of the Chronica Adefonsi imperatoris. PhD dissertation, Northwestern University. 1972. 

Iberian chronicles
12th-century history books
12th-century Latin books
12th century in the Kingdom of León